Donald Duck and the Gorilla is a Donald Duck short adventure horror monster film which was originally released in 1944. It stars Donald Duck along with his three nephews; Huey, Dewey and Louie and Ajax, the killer gorilla. The 1930 Mickey Mouse cartoon The Gorilla Mystery has a similar plot involving a gorilla named Beppo who captures Minnie Mouse.

Plot
On a stormy night, Donald and his nephews overhear the radio announcer, Breckenridge, notify the listeners that a gorilla named Ajax has escaped from the city zoo. The nephews' huddle in fright and Donald laughs at them. As a prank, Donald frightens his nephews with gorilla hands to make it seem as if he is Ajax. The nephews view Donald from the keyhole and to get revenge on their uncle, they dress up in a gorilla suit and lay under Donald on the armchair (which Donald was sitting on to read a fairytale book), and take a bite out of Donald's lollipop while Donald is not noticing. Donald hears the crunching noise and discovers the mark left by the costume's sharp teeth in the lollipop and stares up at the fake gorilla, pale in fright, he runs away. The nephews pop up from inside the suit and laugh hysterically.

At the same time, the real Ajax appears in front of the window and breaks into the house. Ajax then lets out an enormous roar and the nephews run away, still wearing the suit. Donald, who was hiding in a vase beneath an umbrella, spots them and their disguised gorilla suit and angrily chases them. Ajax appears in front of them and the triplets escape, but Donald momentarily assumes that Ajax is the triplets in disguise and grabs Ajax by the face to remove the "disguise" before spotting them across the hall. When Donald realizes that Ajax is not the fake gorilla (after opening his mouth and calling for them), Ajax roars at him and Donald almost faints until Breckenridge says that he can master any wild animal by looking them straight in the eye. Donald stares into Ajax's eye; however, he sees his pupil forming a tombstone reading "Here lies a dead duck". As Ajax is about to eat Donald alive, Donald shoves an umbrella into Ajax's mouth and escapes.

Donald and his nephews are then shown quietly tiptoeing away to search for Ajax, but one of them accidentally spills some candle wax on Donald's behind and later burns Donald's back. Donald's head briefly turns into a boiling kettle, and he angrily drives the triplets away and gets his hand burnt on a doorknob due to unknowingly holding the candle's flame under it. Later, Donald searches for Ajax on his own and unfortunately crosses paths with the gorilla, who was standing on his head, and Donald does not even realize his presence until his tail feathers hint at him, and Ajax starts chasing Donald.

Ajax chases Donald through his house, causing a lot of havoc of the house, like scraping a column, and crashing through the ceiling to the bedroom after Donald tricks Ajax into running up a ladder at the end of the stairs and destroying wooden planks from a long table. Ajax pushes the table to try to crush Donald and then tries to bite Donald's tail, but it pokes him in the eye. Amid all these things, with the help of Breckenridge, the nephews use tear gas in an attempt to stop Ajax, and it successfully subdues Ajax but affects Donald as well. Tearing up, Ajax and Donald console one another and cry as the cartoon ends.

Voice cast
Clarence Nash as Donald Duck, Huey, Dewey and Louie
James MacDonald as Ajax the Gorilla

Home media
The short was released on December 6, 2005 on Walt Disney Treasures: The Chronological Donald, Volume Two: 1942-1946.

Additional releases include:
VHS
Cartoon Classics : First Series : Volume 3 : Scary Tales
Disney's Halloween Treat
Cartoon Classics : Second Series : Volume 13 : Donald's Scary Tales
Mickey's House of Villains

Laserdisc
Cartoon Classics : Scary Tales
Donald's Scary Tales
Halloween Haunts

DVD
Mickey's House of Villains

VCD
Cartoon Classics: Birdbrain Donald (Malaysian Release)

Television
The Ink and Paint Club : #34 : Donald's Nephews

See also
 List of World War II short films

References

External links

1944 films
1940s monster movies
Donald Duck short films
1940s Disney animated short films
American monster movies
1944 animated films
1944 short films
World War II films made in wartime
Animated films about gorillas
Films directed by Jack King
Films produced by Walt Disney
Films scored by Oliver Wallace